Flournoy may refer to:

 Flournoy, California, census-designated place in Tehama County
 Flournoy Township, Thurston County, Nebraska, township
 Flournoy Valley Airport, private Airport in Roseburg, Oregon
 Flournoy (surname)

People with the first name 

 Flournoy Eakin Miller (1885–1971), African American composer, singer, writer, and actor (Miller and Lyles)
 James Flournoy Holmes, album-cover artist
 John Flournoy Henry (1793–1873), U.S. Representative from Kentucky
 John Flournoy Montgomery (1878–1954), American businessman and diplomat
 Thomas Flournoy Foster (1790–1848), American politician and lawyer